Lessa was a village of ancient Argolis, part of Epidauria, upon the confines of the territory of Argos, and at the foot of Mount Arachnaeum. Pausanias, when visiting there in the 2nd century, saw there a temple of Athena.

Its site is located near the modern Kazarma.

References

Populated places in ancient Argolis
Former populated places in Greece